Simonović is a Serbo-Croatian surname, a patronymic derived from the given name Simon. Notable people with the surname include:

Ana Simonović (born 1969), Serbian politician and biologist
Boško Simonović (1898–1965), Yugoslavian football coach, player, referee, and administrator
Čolak-Anta Simonović (1777–1853), Serbian commander
Dragoljub Simonović (born 1972), Bulgarian - Serbian former footballer
Ifigenija Zagoričnik Simonović (born 1953), Slovene poet, essayist, writer, editor and potter
Ljubodrag Simonović (born 1949), Serbian philosopher, author and former basketball player

Saša Simonović (born 1975), former Serbian footballer
Stojan Simonović (1872–1937), Serbian Chetnik, nicknamed Koruba

See also
 
 Simović
 Šimonović
 Simunović

Serbian surnames
Slavic-language surnames
Patronymic surnames
Surnames from given names